Christopher Gelpi (born 1966) is an American political scientist at Ohio State University. He is currently the Director of the Mershon Center for Conflict Resolution, the Endowed Chair in Peace Studies and Conflict Resolution, and a published author who writes on the sources of international military conflict and American public opinion on foreign policy issues.

References

External links
 Political science department at Ohio State
 Christopher Gelpi's website

1966 births
American political scientists
Ohio State University faculty
Living people
Place of birth missing (living people)